Scottish hip hop is the regional manifestation of the British hip hop culture in Scotland, comprising the five elements of MCing, DJing, beatboxing, graffiti and b-boying.

History
In the 1980s, elements of hip hop culture had spread to Scotland. Scottish actor and stand-up comedian Johnny Beattie claimed to be "Scotland's first rap star". His song "The Glasgow Rap" was released in 1983 and received some chart success at the time.

In the late 1980s artists such as Two Tone Committee, Bill Drummond, Krack Free Media, Dope Inc and into the early 1990s with Blacka'nized, NorthernXposure, Zulu Syndicate, Eastborn, Major Threat, All Time High and UTI (Under The Influence) laid the groundwork for a Scottish Hip Hop subculture, rapping consciously about their own lives and problems in their own voices rather than emulating American rappers of the time. The first Scottish hip-hop on vinyl was The Frontal Attack, released by Dope Inc in 1991. In Glasgow, Steg G & the Freestyle Master were producing work that added a west coast twist to Scottish rap.

In the early 2010s, a defined scene became more visible in the mainstream for various reasons.

Firstly, the emergence of "written" battle rap as a defined artform led to greater exposure of the scene as whole, thanks to the creation of battle events in both Edinburgh & Glasgow by Nity Gritz, co-hosted by Werd (S.O.S)  This even culminated in a Scotsman becoming the de facto UK battle rap champion when Soul became the Don't Flop champion in 2015.

Several artists within the hip hop community also became galvanised by the 2014 Scottish independence referendum. The likes of Loki and Stanley Odd championed the Yes vote. The former emerged as an activist and cultural voice on behalf of the hip hop community, while the latter went viral with their single "Son, I Voted Yes".

Elsewhere, several acts within the scene broke into the mainstream. The likes of Hector Bizerk and The LaFontaines earned prestigious slots at the T in the Park festival, as well as widespread critical recognition. Meanwhile, Young Fathers, a hip hop group from Edinburgh, achieved UK-wide success with their album "Dead", for which they won the Mercury prize. While Edinburgh's Madhat McGore pushed the music further down south, working with English acts and appearing on Charlie Sloth's BBC Fire in the Booth. Eastborn toured Australia, the US and China, as well as guest slot presenter of BBC 1xtra.

Edinburgh Born Rob Mitchell leads Abstract Orchestra, a British hip hop orchestra that are known for reworking classic American hip hop and working with both UK and US artists.

In July 2015, the Audio Soup festival in Dunbar became the first to dedicate an entire stage to Scottish hip hop artists.

Breakdancing
From the inception of Hip hop culture in Scotland, break dancing became a popular dance form. Castle Rocks was Scotland's biggest ever bboy competition and attracted competitors from Korea, Brazil, France, Belgium, the Netherlands, Norway etc. and across the UK. It was established in 2005 and ended in 2012. Some prominent Scottish crews (past and present): Flyin' Jalapeños Crew, Laser city crew, 141 Crew, White City Breakers, Random Askpektz.

References

Scottish music
Scottish styles of music
British hip hop
1990s in music
2000s in music
1990s in Scotland
2000s in Scotland